The Andreotti VI Cabinet was a cabinet of the Italian Republic. It held office from 1989 to 1991.

Andreotti was forced to resign after that the PRI left the majority. On 12 April 1991, he received once again the presidential mandate to form a new government.

Party breakdown
 Christian Democracy (DC): Prime Minister, 14 ministers, 35 undersecretaries
 Italian Socialist Party (PSI): Deputy Prime minister, 9 ministers, 19 undersecretaries
 Italian Republican Party (PRI): 3 ministers, 6 undersecretaries
 Italian Democratic Socialist Party (PSDI): 2 ministers, 4 undersecretaries
 Italian Liberal Party (PLI): 2 ministers, 4 undersecretaries

Composition

|}

References

Andreotti 6 Cabinet
Italian governments
Cabinets established in 1989
Cabinets disestablished in 1991
1989 establishments in Italy
1991 disestablishments in Italy